3 Aquarii (abbreviated 3 Aqr) is a variable star in the equatorial constellation of Aquarius. 3 Aquarii is the Flamsteed designation; it also bears the Bayer designation k Aquarii and the variable star designation EN Aquarii. With a mean apparent visual magnitude of 4.429, it is visible to the naked eye in dark skies.

With a stellar classification of M3 III, this is a red giant star that has exhausted the hydrogen at its core and evolved away from the main sequence of stars like the Sun. At the estimated distance of 3 Aquarii, this yields a physical size of about 108 times the radius of the Sun.

The apparent magnitude of 3 Aquarii varies by up to 0.06 magnitudes, which was first noted in the 1960s.  It was formally listed as a variable star in 1973, and given the variable star designation EN Aquarii.  It is classified as an irregular variable, although detailed analysis shows multiple possible periods.

References

External links
 Image 3 Aquarii

Aquarii, k
Aquarii, 003
Aquarii, EN
198026
Aquarius (constellation)
Slow irregular variables
102624
7951
BD-05 5378
M-type giants